Murt (also Romanized as Mūrt; also known as Kāni Mūrt) is a village in Arkavazi Rural District, Chavar District, Ilam County, Ilam Province, Iran. At the 2006 census, its population was 1,082, in 204 families. The village is populated by Kurds.

References 

Populated places in Ilam County
Kurdish settlements in Ilam Province